Anita Meyer (Annita Meijer), born in Rotterdam 29 October 1954, is a Dutch singer. One of her most notable songs is "Why Tell Me Why" that charted for 14 weeks and topped the Dutch singles list for six weeks in 1981.

Discography

Albums 
In The Meantime I Will Sing (1976) #20 NED
Love You Too Much (1979)
Shades of Desire (1981) #1 NED
Past, Present and Future (1982) #5 NED
Moments Together (1983) #10 NED
Face to Face (1984) #10 NED
Greatest Hits (1985) #10 NED
Now and Forever (1986) #23 NED
Run to Me (with Lee Towers) (1986) #5 NED
Première (1987) #13 NED
The Ahoy Concert (Live album) (1988) #15 NED
Close to You (1989) #21 NED
Autumn Leaves (1990) #37 NED
The Commandments (1990)
Memories of Love (1991)
RTL 4: De Hits van Anita Meyer (1991)
The Alternative Way (1991)
The Very Best of Anita Meyer (1991)
Music Music (1992) #53 NED
Best Of (1993)
The Love of a Woman (1994)
A Song Can Change Your Life (1996)
Dichter bij Elkaar (1998) #95 NED
Just Once (1999)
Spanish Guitar (2001)
Tears Go By (2009) with Metropole Orkest #54 NED

Singles 
"Just a Disillusion" (1976) #18 NED
"The Alternative Way"(with Rainbow Train)  (1976) #1 NED
"You Can Do It" (1976) #9 NED
"Anita That's My Name" (1977) #21 NED
"It Hurts" (1977)
"You Are My Everything" (with Hans Vermeulen from Sandy Coast) (1979)
"Rock Me Up A Mountain" (1980) #28 NED
"The Hurtin' Doesn't Go Away" (1981)
"Why Tell Me Why" (1981) #1 NED (Best-selling single in the Netherlands in 1981)
"They Don't Play Our Lovesong Anymore" (1981) #3 NED
"Blame It On Love" (1982)
"Idaho" (1982) #4 NED
"The One That You Love" (1982) #16 NED
"Goodbye To Love" (1983) #23 NED
"Sandy's Song" (1983) #23 NED
"Blame It On Love" (1984) #33 NED
"Heart Of Stone" (1984) #26 NED
"This Ain't A Life To Be Lived" (1984)
"Sometimes When We Touch" (1985)
"The Story Of A New Born Love" (1985)
"Run To Me" (with Lee Towers, live) (1986) #9 NED
"We've Got Tonight" (with Lee Towers) (1986) #31 NED
"You Are My Life" (1986)
"Now and Forever" (1987)
"The Exodus Song" (1987)
"Having My Baby" (with Paul Anka)  (1988)
"That's What Friends Are For" (1989)
"Freedom" (1990) #21 NED
"Music Music (This Is Why)" (1992) #34 NED
"The Medicine Of Love" (1992)
"Het Spijt Me" (Title song for TV-program) (1993) #24 NED
"I Couldn't Say Goodbye" (1993)
"I've Heard It All Before" (1994)
"The Love of A Woman" (1994)
"De Warmte Van Je Hart" (1996)
"I Don't Wanna Cry Again" (1996)
"We Are The Wave" (1996)
"Nooit Meer Naar Parijs" (1998)
"Wacht Op Mij" (1998)
"Mas Alla" (2001)
"Salomé" (2001)
"Het lieftallige buurmeisje van de oosterweg" (2021)

References

External links
Homepage

1954 births
Living people
Dutch women singers
Musicians from Rotterdam